JKT Mgambo is a football club based in Tanga, Tanzania. They play in the top level of Tanzanian professional football, the Tanzanian Premier League.

External links
Club logo

Football clubs in Tanzania
Tanga, Tanzania